The 2019–20 3. Liga was the twelfth season of the 3. Liga. It started on 19 July 2019 and concluded on 4 July 2020. Bayern Munich II won the league title on the final day of the season to become the first reserve team to win the 3. Liga.

Effects of the COVID-19 pandemic
Due to the COVID-19 pandemic in Germany, the matchdays 28 and 29 were postponed and will be rescheduled. On 16 March, the DFB announced that the league would be suspended until 30 April. On 27 April, the league was suspended further but with intention to return. A decision on the resumption of the competition, similar to the Bundesliga and 2. Bundesliga, took place at an extraordinary meeting of the DFB-Bundestag on 25 May 2020. On 15 May, after the DFB said earlier that 26 May would be the start date to resume, the date was moved back as not all teams can train again regularly. The intention still was to finish the season, with games maybe even after 30 June. On 21 May, the DFB announced that the season will be continued on 30 May. That was confirmed on 25 May. On 29 May, after a meeting of all clubs, five substitutions will be permitted, which has been temporarily allowed by IFAB following a proposal by FIFA to lessen the impact of fixture congestion.

Teams

Team changes

Stadiums and locations

Personnel and kits

Managerial changes

League table

Results

Top scorers

Number of teams by state

References

2019–20 in German football leagues
2019–20
Germany
Liga